The thirteenth season of the Case Closed anime was directed by Masato Satō and produced by TMS Entertainment and Yomiuri Telecasting Corporation. The series is based on Gosho Aoyama's Case Closed manga series. In Japan, the series is titled  but was changed due to legal issues with the title Detective Conan. The episodes' plot follows Conan Edogawa's daily adventures.

The episodes use four pieces of theme music: two opening themes and two ending themes.

The season initially ran from March 8, 2004 through February 7, 2005 on Nippon Television Network System in Japan. Episodes 354 to 389 were later collected into ten DVD compilations by Shogakukan. They were released between December 23, 2005 and April 28, 2006 in Japan.


Episode list

References
General

Specific

2004 Japanese television seasons
2005 Japanese television seasons
Season13